This is a list of finance ministers of Prussia.

Finance